John G. Hemry (LCDR, USN ret.; born April 14, 1956), is an American author of military science fiction novels.  Drawing on his experience as a retired United States Navy officer, he has written the Stark's War and Paul Sinclair series.  Under the name Jack Campbell, he has written six volumes of The Lost Fleet series and the steampunk/fantasy The Pillars of Reality series.  He has also written over a dozen short stories, many published in Analog magazine, and a number of non-fiction works.

Hemry has continued the Lost Fleet series with a spin-off: Beyond the Frontier, focusing on the main characters from the Lost Fleet. A second series, called The Lost Stars, focuses on the collapse of the Syndicate Worlds.

Awards and honors 
 Winner of 2006 Anlab vote for best short story

Publications

As John G. Hemry

Stark's War
The series follows a conflict between US Army soldiers and their leadership during a campaign that takes place on the Moon. Faced with increasingly outrageous disregard for their survival, the enlisted soldiers mutiny under the leadership of Sergeant Stark, who then faces an uncertain path in dealing with the civilian colony they are based next to, as well as the Pentagon and US government.

 Stark's War (April 2000)
 Stark's Command (April 2001)
 Stark's Crusade (March 2002)

Paul Sinclair (JAG in Space)
The publisher promotes this series descriptively as "JAG, set in space". The title character is a junior officer aboard the USS Michaelson, a military spaceship in peacetime conditions. While he faces the trials of maturing as a line officer, Sinclair also serves as his commanders' legal advisor—a role that brings him into close contact with the military legal system.

 A Just Determination (May 2003)
 Burden of Proof (March 2004)
 Rule of Evidence (March 2005)
 Against All Enemies (March 2006)

Short fiction

As Jack Campbell

The Lost Fleet

 The Lost Fleet: Dauntless (2006)
 The Lost Fleet: Fearless (2007)
 The Lost Fleet: Courageous (2007)
 The Lost Fleet: Valiant (2008)
 The Lost Fleet: Relentless (2009)
 The Lost Fleet: Victorious (2010)

The Lost Fleet: Beyond the Frontier

Sequel to The Lost Fleet series.
The Lost Fleet: Beyond the Frontier: Dreadnaught (2011)
The Lost Fleet: Beyond the Frontier: Invincible (2012)
The Lost Fleet: Beyond the Frontier: Guardian (2013)
The Lost Fleet: Beyond the Frontier: Steadfast (2014)
The Lost Fleet: Beyond the Frontier: Leviathan (2015)

The Lost Stars

Spin-off of The Lost Fleet series.
The Lost Stars: Tarnished Knight (2012)
The Lost Stars: Perilous Shield (2013)
The Lost Stars: Imperfect Sword (2014)
The Lost Stars: Shattered Spear (May 2016)

The Genesis Fleet

Prequel to The Lost Fleet series.
The Genesis Fleet: Vanguard (2017)
The Genesis Fleet: Ascendant (2018)
The Genesis Fleet: Triumphant (2019)

Outlands

Sequel to The Lost Fleet series.
Outlands: Boundless (2021)
Outlands: Resolute (2022)

Short stories
 "Grendel" (2009)
 "Flèche" (2013)
 "Shore Patrol" (2017)
 "Ishigaki" (2019)

The Pillars of Reality
The Dragons of Dorcastle (2014)
The Hidden Masters of Marandur (2015): "continues a fascinating science fiction story set in a world divided between mechanics, mages, and the common folk"
The Assassins of Altis (2015)
The Pirates of Pacta Servanda (2016)
The Servants of the Storm (2016)
The Wrath of the Great Guilds (2016)

The Legacy of Dragons
Sequel to The Pillars of Reality series
Daughter of Dragons (Audible: Feb 2017)
Blood of Dragons (Audible: Aug 2017)
Destiny of Dragons (Audible: Jan 2018)

Empress of the Endless Sea
Prequel to The Pillars of Reality series.
 Pirate of the Prophecy  (Audible: Mar 2020)
 Explorer of the Endless Sea (Audible: Mar 2020)
 Fate of the Free Lands (Audible: Mar 2020)

Collections
 Ad Astra (2013) 
 Borrowed Time (2013) 
 Swords and Saddles (2013)

Other
 The Last Full Measure (2013) 
 The Sister Paradox (2017)

References

External links
 Official web site
 
 Review of  A Just Determination
 Review of Burden of Proof
 Black Jack Calling, an interview with Jack Campbell, AKA John G Hemry at Geek Speak Magazine

1956 births
20th-century American novelists
20th-century American short story writers
20th-century American male writers
21st-century American novelists
21st-century American short story writers
21st-century American male writers
American male novelists
American male short story writers
American science fiction writers
Analog Science Fiction and Fact people
Living people
Military science fiction writers